Edward Ngara is a Solomon Islands professional football manager.

Career
Since 1995 until 1996 he coached the Solomon Islands national football team.

References

External links

Year of birth missing (living people)
Living people
Solomon Islands football managers
Solomon Islands national football team managers
Place of birth missing (living people)